The 11th Magritte Awards ceremony, presented by the Académie André Delvaux, honored the best films of 2020 and 2021 in Belgium. It took place on 12 February 2022, at the Square, in the historic site of Mont des Arts, Brussels. It was the first ceremony in two years after the 2021 event was cancelled due to the COVID-19 pandemic. During the ceremony, the Académie André Delvaux presented Magritte Awards in 23 categories. The ceremony, televised in Belgium by La Trois, was produced by Leslie Cable and Tanguy Cortier and was directed by Benoît Vlietinck. Film director Thierry Michel presided the ceremony, while comedians Laurence Bibot, Dena, Ingrid Heiderscheidt, Achille Ridolfi and Bwanga Pilipili co-hosted the show.

The nominees for the 11th Magritte Awards were announced on 12 January 2022. Films with the most nominations were Madly in Life with twelve, followed by Playground with ten, and Adoration and The Restless with six. The winners were announced during the awards ceremony on 12 February 2022. Madly in Life won seven awards, including Best Film. Other multiple winners were Playground with seven awards and Titane with two.

Winners and nominees

Best Film
 Madly in Life (Une vie démente) Adoration
 Playground (Un monde)
 The Restless (Les Intranquilles)
 Working Girls (Filles de joie)

Best Director
 Laura Wandel – Playground (Un monde) Fabrice Du Welz – Adoration
 Joachim Lafosse – The Restless (Les Intranquilles)
 Ann Sirot and Raphaël Balboni – Madly in Life (Une vie démente)

Best Actor
 Jean Le Peltier – Madly in Life (Une vie démente) Bouli Lanners – Love Song for Tough Guys (Cette musique ne joue pour personne) 
 Jérémie Renier – Slalom
 Arieh Worthalter – Hold Me Tight (Serre moi fort)

Best Actress
 Jo Deseure – Madly in Life (Une vie démente) Lubna Azabal – Adam
 Lucie Debay – Madly in Life (Une vie démente)
 Virginie Efira – Bye Bye Morons (Adieu les cons)

Best Supporting Actor
 Gilles Remiche – Madly in Life (Une vie démente) Patrick Descamps – The Restless (Les Intranquilles)
 Sam Louwyck – Jumbo
 Benoît Poelvoorde – Adoration

Best Supporting Actress
 Laura Verlinden – Playground (Un monde) Myriem Akheddiou – Titane
 Claire Bodson – Mother Schmuckers (Fils de plouc)
 Émilie Dequenne – Love Affair(s) (Les choses qu'on dit, les choses qu'on fait)

Most Promising Actor
 Günter Duret – Playground (Un monde) Roméo Elvis – Mandibles (Mandibules)
 Basile Grunberger – SpaceBoy
 Yoann Zimmer – Home Front (Des hommes)

Most Promising Actress
 Maya Vanderbeque – Playground (Un monde) Salomé Dewaels – Lost Illusions (Illusions perdues)
 Fantine Harduin – Adoration
 Daphné Patakia – Benedetta

Best Screenplay
 Madly in Life (Une vie démente) – Ann Sirot and Raphaël Balboni Playground (Un monde) – Laura Wandel
 The Restless (Les Intranquilles) – Joachim Lafosse
 Working Girls (Filles de joie) – Anne Paulicevich

Best First Feature Film
 Playground (Un monde) Jumbo
 Madly in Life (Une vie démente)
 Mother Schmuckers (Fils de plouc)

Best Flemish Film
 La Civil 
 The Barefoot Emperor
 Dealer
 Rookie

Best Foreign Film in Coproduction
 Titane
 Adam
 The Man Who Sold His Skin
 Onoda: 10,000 Nights in the Jungle (Onoda, 10 000 nuits dans la jungle)

Best Cinematography
 Titane – Ruben Impens
 Adoration – Manuel Dacosse
 Playground (Un monde) – Frédéric Noirhomme

Best Production Design
 Madly in Life (Une vie démente) – Lisa Etienne
 The Restless (Les Intranquilles) – Anna Falguères
 Titane – Laurie Colson and Lise Péault

Best Costume Design
 Madly in Life (Une vie démente) – Frédérick Denis
 Our Men (Mon légionnaire) – Catherine Cosme
 Working Girls (Filles de joie) – Ann Lauwerys

Best Original Score
 Adoration – Vincent Cahay
 My Voice Will Be with You (Ma voix t'accompagnera) – Loup Mormont
 Rookie – DAAN

Best Sound
 Playground (Un monde) – Mathieu Cox, Corinne Dubien, Thomas Grimm-Landsberg, David Vranken
 Madly in Life (Une vie démente) – Bruno Schweisguth, Julien Mizac, Philippe Charbonnel
 Titane – Séverin Favriau, Fabrice Osinski, Stéphane Thiébaut

Best Editing
 Playground (Un monde) – Nicolas Rumpl
 Madly in Life (Une vie démente) – Sophie Vercruysse and Raphaël Balboni
 The Restless (Les Intranquilles) – Marie-Hélène Dozo

Best Live Action Short Film
 Squish (Sprötch) – Xavier Seron
 The Salamander Child (L'enfant salamandre) – Théo Degen
 Titan – Valéry Carnoy
 You're Dead Hélène (T'es morte Hélène) – Michiel Blanchart

Best Animated Short Film
 And Yet We're Not Superheroes (On est pas près d'être des super héros) – Lia Bertels
 Amours Libres – Emily Worms
 Le Quatuor à cornes : là-haut sur la montagne – Benjamin Botella and Arnaud Demuynck
 Tête de linotte ! – Gaspar Chabaud

Best Documentary Film
 Petit Samedi – Paloma Sermon-Daï
 #salepute – Florence Hainaut and Myriam Leroy
 Chasing the Dragons (Chasser les dragons) – Alexandra Kandy-Longuet
 My Voice Will Be with You (Ma voix t'accompagnera) – Bruno Tracq

Best Documentary Short Film
 Mother's – Hippolyte Leibovici
 Belgium-20 – Jean-Benoît Ugeux
 Juliette the Great – Alice Khol
 Maîtresse – Linda Ibbari

Honorary Magritte Award
 Marion Hänsel

Films with multiple nominations and awards

The following eleven films received multiple nominations.
Twelve: Madly in Life
Ten: Playground
Six: Adoration, The Restless
Five: Titane
Three: Working Girls
Two: Adam, Jumbo, Mother Schmuckers, My Voice Will Be with You, Rookie

The following three films received multiple awards.
 Seven: Madly in Life, Playground
 Two: Titane

See also

 2021 in film
 Impact of the COVID-19 pandemic on cinema
 47th César Awards
 27th Lumières Awards

References

External links
 
 

2022
2020 film awards
2021 film awards
2022 in Belgium
Events postponed due to the COVID-19 pandemic
Impact of the COVID-19 pandemic on cinema